Óskar Örn Hauksson (born 22 August 1984) is an Icelandic football player, currently playing for Stjarnan. He has previously played for Njarðvík, Sogndal, Grindavík, Knattspyrnufélag Reykjavíkur and been on loan to Sandnes Ulf and FC Edmonton. He is the all-time top scorer for KR in the Icelandic top division and was the 2019 Úrvalsdeild Player of the Year when he led KR to his 3rd and the club's 27th league title.

References

External links
 

1984 births
Living people
Oskar Orn Hauksson
Oskar Orn Hauksson
Oskar Orn Hauksson
Sogndal Fotball players
Oskar Orn Hauksson
Oskar Orn Hauksson
Sandnes Ulf players
FC Edmonton players
Eliteserien players
Oskar Orn Hauksson
Expatriate footballers in Norway
Oskar Orn Hauksson
Expatriate soccer players in Canada
North American Soccer League players
Association football midfielders
Oskar Orn Hauksson